In the Parliament of the United Kingdom, the Committee of the Whole House is a committee of the whole of one of the two Houses.

In the House of Commons, the Committee of the Whole House is used instead of a standing committee for the committee stage (clause-by-clause debate) of important or contentious bills. The Finance Bill is always sent to a Committee of the Whole House in the Commons, The sitting is presided over by the Chairman of Ways and Means, rather than the Speaker of the House. sitting in the clerk's chair rather than the Speaker's chair normally occupied by the presiding officer.

In the House of Lords, the Committee of the Whole House examines the majority of bills.

References

Westminster system
Committees of the House of Lords
Committees of the British House of Commons